Phillip Logan (born 4 July 1989) is a  Democratic Unionist Party (DUP) politician who served as a Member of the Northern Ireland Assembly (MLA) for North Antrim from 2016 to 2017.

Logan lost his seat in the 2017 Assembly election.

References

1979 births
Living people
Democratic Unionist Party MLAs
Northern Ireland MLAs 2016–2017